Jung Ae-ri (born August 11, 1960) is a South Korean actress.

Career
Jung Ae-ri made her acting debut after she was chosen at the KBS talent audition in 1978. In 1980, she moved to another network, MBC. She rose to stardom in the 1985 drama Love and Truth, for which she won the Daesang ("Grand Prize") at the MBC Drama Awards and Best TV Actress at the Baeksang Arts Awards. After she got married in 1985, Lee immigrated to the United States and temporarily retired from acting. She returned to Korea in 1988 and resumed her career. Lee has since had a prolific career and remains active on television.

In 1997, she received much acclaim for a local stage production of A Streetcar Named Desire, including the Best Actress award at the Seoul Theater Festival. Jung was again praised for 2010's The Most Beautiful Goodbye in the World (also known as The Most Beautiful Farewell), a stage remake of Noh Hee-kyung's 1996 TV series. One review called her performance "stirring" and "incendiary," and that "it transcends the trite plot and elevates it above its television predecessor. Her portrayal is one that resonates long after the curtains are drawn."

Other activities
In 2007, the Inter-Parliamentarians for Social Service honored Jung for giving aid as a sponsor to starving children in Korea and overseas. She has been particularly active in her volunteer work in orphanages since 1989.

Personal life
After 20 years of marriage, Jung and her first husband divorced in 2005. They have one daughter, Ji-hyun. Jung remarried in 2011 to Ji Seung-ryong, a businessman who studied theology at Yonsei University.

Filmography

Television series

Films

Theater

Book

Awards

References

External links
 
 
 
 

South Korean film actresses
South Korean television actresses
South Korean stage actresses
1960 births
Living people
Best Actress Paeksang Arts Award (television) winners